Macedonia (officially under the provisional appellation "former Yugoslav Republic of Macedonia", abbreviated "FYR Macedonia") participated in the Eurovision Song Contest 2009 with the song "Nešto što kje ostane" written by Jovan Jovanov, Damjan Lazarov and Elvir Mekić. The song was performed by the duo Next Time. The Macedonian broadcaster Macedonian Radio Television (MRT) organised Skopje Fest 2009 in order to select the Macedonian entry for the 2009 contest in Moscow, Russia. 32 entries competed in the competition which consisted of three shows: two semi-finals and a final. Sixteen songs competed in each semi-final and the top eight from each semi-final qualified to the final. In the final, "Nešto što kje ostane" performed by Next Time was selected following the combination of votes from a twelve-member jury panel and a public televote.

Macedonia was drawn to compete in the first semi-final of the Eurovision Song Contest which took place on 12 May 2009. Performing during the show in position 13, "Nešto što kje ostane" was not announced among the 10 qualifying entries of the first semi-final and therefore did not qualify to compete in the final. It was later revealed that Macedonia placed tenth out of the 18 participating countries in the semi-final with 45 points.

Background

The nation's best result in the contest to this point was twelfth, which it achieved in 2006 with the song "Ninanajna" performed by Elena Risteska.

The Macedonian national broadcaster, Macedonian Radio Television (MRT), broadcasts the event within Macedonia and organises the selection process for the nation's entry. Macedonia had previously selected their entry for the Eurovision Song Contest through both national finals and internal selections. Despite rumours of a withdrawal due to financial difficulties which could have ended in bankruptcy or liquidation of MRT, the broadcaster confirmed their intentions to participate at the 2009 Eurovision Song Contest on 6 November 2008 and held weekly debate programs to as a platform for discussion on how the selection process for the Macedonian entry can be fair and successful. In 2008, Macedonia selected their entry using the national final Skopje Fest but failed to qualify to the final. For 2009, the broadcaster again opted to select the Macedonian entry through Skopje Fest.

Before Eurovision

Skopje Fest 2009 
Skopje Fest 2009 was a song contest organised by MRT that served as Macedonia's national final to select their entry for the Eurovision Song Contest 2009. Thirty-two entries participated in the competition which consisted of two semi-finals on 18 and 19 February 2009 leading to a sixteen-song final on 20 February 2009. All three shows took place at the Universal Hall in Skopje, hosted by Zoran Ljutkov and Biljana Gjorgjiovska and were broadcast on MTV 1, MTV Sat and Macedonian Radio.

Format 
The format of the competition included two semi-finals on 19 and 20 February 2009 and a final on 21 February 2009. Sixteen songs competed in each semi-final and the top eight from each semi-final qualified to complete the sixteen song lineup in the final. The results of the semi-finals and the final were determined by the 50/50 combination of votes from an expert jury panel and public televoting. The public could vote through telephone and SMS.

Competing entries 
A submission period was opened for interested artists and composers to submit their entries between 26 November 2008 and 25 December 2008. MRT received 142 submissions at the closing of the deadline and thirty-two entries were selected by a six-member committee consisting of Gordana Andrashevska (MTV), Ljupčo Mirkovski (artistic director of Skopje Fest), Meri Popova (MTV), Radica Mitić (MR 2), Ariton Krliu (MR 2) and Danail Darkovski (composer and instrumentalist). The thirty-two competing songs were announced on 6 January 2009, while their artists were announced on 15 January 2009. On 23 January 2009, MRT announced that "Ti peam pesna", written by Kire Kostov and performed by Aleksandar Belov was withdrawn from the competition and replaced with the song "Isto što i ti" by Treta dimenzija, while Stefan Cvetkovski would replace Naum Petreski as the performer of the song "Zemi se".

Shows

Semi-finals
The two semi-finals took place on 19 and 20 February 2009. Sixteen entries competed in each semi-final and top eight entries qualified to the final by a 50/50 combination of public televoting and a twelve-member jury panel. In addition to the performances of the competing entries, the first semi-final featured a guest performance by 2005 Macedonian Eurovision representative Martin Vučić, while the second semi-final featured guest performances by DJ Pancho, Rebis and participants of the project Kirilitso ispeana.

Final
The final took place on 21 February 2009. Sixteen entries competed and a 50/50 combination of public televoting and a twelve-member jury panel selected "Nešto što kje ostane" performed by Next Time as the winner. In addition to the performances of the competing entries, the competition featured guest performances by 2006 Macedonian Eurovision representative Elena Risteska, 2009 Belarusian Eurovision representative Petr Elfimov, 2009 Montenegrin Eurovision representative Andrea Demirović and 2009 Bosnian Eurovision representative Regina.

Promotion 
Next Time made several appearances across Europe to specifically promote "Nešto što kje ostane" as the Macedonian Eurovision entry. On 1 March, Next Time performed "Nešto što kje ostane" during the presentation show of the 2009 Bosnian Eurovision entry, BH Eurosong Show 2009. Next Time also performed the song during the semi-final of the Serbian Eurovision national final Beovizija 2009 on 7 March.

At Eurovision

According to Eurovision rules, all nations with the exceptions of the host country and the "Big Four" (France, Germany, Spain and the United Kingdom) are required to qualify from one of two semi-finals in order to compete for the final; the top nine songs from each semi-final as determined by televoting progress to the final, and a tenth was determined by back-up juries. The European Broadcasting Union (EBU) split up the competing countries into six different pots based on voting patterns from previous contests, with countries with favourable voting histories put into the same pot. On 30 January 2009, a special allocation draw was held which placed each country into one of the two semi-finals. Macedonia was placed into the first semi-final, to be held on 12 May 2009. The running order for the semi-finals was decided through another draw on 16 March 2009 and Macedonia was set to perform in position 13, following the entry from Iceland and before the entry from Romania.

The two semi-finals and final were broadcast in Macedonia on MTV 1 and MTV Sat with commentary by Karolina Petkovska and Aleksandra Jovanovska. The Macedonian spokesperson, who announced the Macedonian votes during the final, was Frosina Josifovska.

Semi-final 

Next Time took part in technical rehearsals on 4 and 7 May, followed by dress rehearsals on 11 and 12 May. The Macedonian performance featured the members of Next Time performing together with two guitarists and two drummers. The background LED screens displayed metallic elements and glass patterns with single white flashing lights being used on stage. The performance also featured several effects including fire and silver pyrotechnics. The four musicians that joined Next Time on stage were the co-composer of "Nešto što kje ostane" Damjan Lazarov, Goran Mihajlovski, Maja Balevska and Mario Stanković.

At the end of the show, Macedonia was not announced among the 10 qualifying entries in the first semi-final and therefore failed to qualify to compete in the final. It was later revealed that Macedonia placed tenth in the semi-final, receiving a total of 36 points.

Voting 
The voting system for 2009 involved each country awarding points from 1-8, 10 and 12, with the points in the final being decided by a combination of 50% national jury and 50% televoting. Each nation's jury consisted of five music industry professionals who are citizens of the country they represent. This jury judged each entry based on: vocal capacity; the stage performance; the song's composition and originality; and the overall impression by the act. In addition, no member of a national jury was permitted to be related in any way to any of the competing acts in such a way that they cannot vote impartially and independently.

Below is a breakdown of points awarded to Macedonia and awarded by Macedonia in the first semi-final and grand final of the contest. The nation awarded its 12 points to Turkey in the semi-final and the final of the contest.

Points awarded to Macedonia

Points awarded by Macedonia

Detailed voting results
The following members comprised the Macedonian jury:

 Rade Spasovski
 Vanco Dimitrov
 Maja Trpčanovska
 Radica Mitić
 Liljana Avtovska

References 

2009
Countries in the Eurovision Song Contest 2009
Eurovision